Tulayl ash-Sham is a village in northern Aleppo Governorate, northwestern Syria.

The village administratively belongs to Nahiya Azaz in Azaz District. Nearby localities include Shamarikh  to the southeast and Shamarin  to the northeast. In the 2004 census, Tulayl ash-Sham had a population of 176.

References

Villages in Syria